Vidas Opostas is a Brazilian telenovela originally aired on Rede Record.

Controversy
Because of scenes involving graphic portrayal of nudity, drugs and violence, Vidas Opostas received a 14 rating from the DJCTQ. Reuters and the Wall Street Journal even reported the fact, suggesting that the show has attained considerable success because of violent scenes, unlike most other Brazilian soap operas.

Main cast

References

External links
Report Reuters 
Article Wall Street Journal

2006 telenovelas
2006 Brazilian television series debuts
2007 Brazilian television series endings
Brazilian telenovelas
RecordTV telenovelas
Portuguese-language telenovelas
Works about organized crime in Brazil